is a Japanese actor. He played the role of Yousuke Shiina (Hurricane Red) in the 2002 Super Sentai TV series Ninpuu Sentai Hurricaneger, and Break Through!.

Filmography

Film

 Break Through! パッチギ!, Pacchigi! (2005)
Like a Dragon (2007)
 Chameleon (2008)
 Ninpū Sentai Hurricaneger: 10 Years After (2012, Toei) – Yousuke Shiina/Hurricane Red
 Haha (2017) – Takiji Kobayashi

Television
 Ninpuu Sentai Hurricaneger (2002) – Yousuke Shiina
 Kaizoku Sentai Gokaiger (2011) – Yousuke Shiina on Episode 25  (Pirates and Ninja) & Episode 26 (Shushūto The Special)

References

Awards 
 2006: 29th Japan Academy Awards — Best Newcomer (for Break Through!)

External links 
 
 
 Official blog "Live is Life"
 
 

Japanese male film actors
Former Stardust Promotion artists
People from Kanazawa, Ishikawa
1982 births
Living people
21st-century Japanese male actors